Uttar Pradesh Lokayukta and Uplokayukta (Sanskrit: उत्तर प्रदेश लोकायुक्त and उपलोकायुक्त) is an anti-corruption ombudsman in the Indian state of Uttar Pradesh.The position of the Lokayukta was established under the Lokayukta Act of 1975. The Lokayukta is from a non-political background and functions as a statutory authority probing into cases primarily related to corruption, government mismanagement, or abuse of power by public servants or ministers. Though the Lokayukta lacks wide investigatory powers, it has caught public attention by investigating high-profile cases.

On January 28, 2016, the Supreme Court of India, recalled its previous order and appointed a new Lokayukta after the state government failed to suggest one.

Selection procedure
According to the Uttar Pradesh Lokayukta and UpLokayukta Act of 1975, the Governor of the state can appoint a person to be the Lokayukta and one or more persons as uplokayukta(s)(Deputy Lokayukta). The Lokayukta's appointment is made after consultations with the Chief Justice of the Allahabad High Court, and the leader of the opposition in the state assembly.The Uplokayukta(s) can be appointed after consulting the Lokayukta.

A person is eligible for the post of the Lokayukta or Uplokayukta if he/she fulfills the following criteria.

 A judge of the Supreme Court or the High Court.
 Never held an office of member of Parliament or severed their connection with it.
 Never held an office of State Legislature.
 Holding no office of trust or profit, or severed their connection with the business or profession if had joined in the past.

Any person appointed as the Lokayukta or Uplokayukta serves the office for a period of eight years after an amendment increased the tenure length by two years. The perks and allowances of the Lokayukta are the same as that of the chief justice while that of an Uplokayukta to a judge of the state's High court. The institution of Lokayukta should have Judicial and Non-Judicial members.

Roles and responsibilities
The functioning of the Uttar Pradesh Lokayukta is to initiate inquiries on complaints regarding maladministration and corruption concerning a State Public Servant". The investigation can be started with specific approval of the concerned ministry and can be either a Grievance or Allegation. Grievance means any claim by a person who faced injustice or undue hardship due to maladministration, whereas, allegation is in relation to a public servant, any government company or corporation in the state or pension and other claims.

Lokayukta or an Uplokayukta enjoys the same powers as that of a civil court under the code of Civil Procedure, 1908 which includes summoning the person, checking any public record or request copy from any court or office and issuing commissions for the examination of witnesses or documents. The lokayukta is also required to ensure the safe custody of relevant documents.  Every investigation is conducted in private, and the identity of the complainant and that of the public servant under investigation not disclosed in any form unless it is related to public importance. After the completion of an investigation, the lokayukta is required to submit the report to the governor.

In case of a false complaint, the lokayukta is empowered to take appropriate action as specified under Code of Criminal Procedure, 1973, which may involve detention of the complainant and up to three years of imprisonment with fine. However, the person can make an appeal which can be admitted only by the session court. However, in any such case, the court cannot compel the lokayukta, uplokayukta or any public servant to furnish any evidence recorded or collected.

The State Government, by a notification published in the gazette, can confer additional powers for specific investigations to the office of the Lokayukta and can even allow them to make new rules for the same.

Recommendations
Many names were suggested for selecting a new Lokayukta after the term of N.K. Mehrotra expired. Despite objections raised by both, the chief justice of the Allahabad High Court and the governor, the state government forwarded the name of retired judge Ravindra Singh to the governor at least four times, without following the due procedure. The chief justice had raised strong objections citing Ravindra Singh's alleged political affiliations with the ruling government of the samajwadi party. The government headed by Akhilesh Yadav neither proposed a fresh name, nor called a meeting of the selection committee regarding the appointment, which led to governor Ram Naik rejecting the name of Singh for a  fifth time in August 2015. The state government passed an amendment in the state assembly on August 28, 2015, removing the clause that required the chief justice of the Allahabad High Court to be a part of the selection committee.; The bill,however lies pending with the governor

Hearings in the Supreme Court
Multiples hearings occurred in the Supreme Court for appointing a new lokayukta. On July 2, 2015, the Court sought the response of the Uttar Pradesh government on a plea seeking replacement of the state's current lokayukta N.K. Mehrotra, The Allahabad High Court also sought response for the same from the government on July 23, 2015. The apex court issued a notice to the government in December, regarding the initiation of contempt proceedings against it for non-compliance of the Court's previous order. On receiving no reply from the government, the supreme court, on December 14, criticized the for not appointing a new lokayukta in the state  and fixed the petitions on the issue for a hearing on December 16.
The Supreme Court had earlier upheld constitutional validity of extending tenure of lokayukta to eight years on 24 April 2014 and had asked for the list of possible appointees within six months. Since the government failed to recommend the list within the time-frame, the Court appointed Virendra Singh as the new lokayukta by exercising its constitutional power under Article 142 of the Constitution The court, however retracted this decision later, after hearing a plea and appointed former judge of Allahabad High Court Sanjay Mishra as the new lokayukta in January 2016.

Appointment
The former Lokayukta N.K. Mehrotra was appointed on 16 March 2006 under the Uttar Pradesh Lokayukta Act. After his term expired on 15 March 2012, the Uttar Pradesh government on the same day brought an ordinance and another on 18 March and extended the period from existing six to eight years, which was later upheld by the Supreme Court.

On July 31, 2012, the state government cabinet approved to keep the office of lokayukta out of the purview of the RTI Act, 2005 citing secrecy while investigating corruption charges. N.K. Mehrotra served nine years in the office, the longest term by a lokayukta in the country. On December 16, 2015, the Supreme Court, invoking its constitutional powers, appointed justice Virendra Singh as the new Lokayukta, while expressing deep regret for constitutional authorities failing to comply with the court's order.

Following objection to Justice Singh's appointment, on January 28, 2016, the Supreme Court retracted its decision and appointed former judge Sanjay Mishra to the office .

Lokayukta(s) of Uttar Pradesh.

Notable cases
The state lokayukta has probed many high-profile cases and some of them are mentioned below.

 Submitted report on the alleged nexus between Ponty Chadha and government headed by Mayawati.
 Recommended CBI investigation against prominent BSP leader Naseemuddin Siddiqui for allegedly amassing disproportionate assets.
 Investigated assets case against state mining minister Gayatri Prasad Prajapati.
 On January 29, 2015, two MLA's of the state assembly were disqualified by the governor on recommendation of lokayukta which indicted them for irregularities.
The lokayukta acquitted Noida based engineer Yadav Singh.

Limitations of Powers
The lokayukta cannot act on any complaint pertaining to people occupying following constitutional posts.
 The Chief Justice or any judge of the High court or member of judicial services.
 Officer or servant of any court. 
 The Accountant General, Uttar pradesh. 
 Chairman or any member of the Uttar pradesh Public Service Commission or its staff. 
 The Chief Election Commissioner, the Election Commissioner, the Regional Commissioner and the Chief Electoral Officer, Uttar Pradesh.
 Any member of the secretariat staff of either House of the state legislature.

If the investigation involves internal security of the state or the disclosure of proceedings of the cabinet of the state government or any committee of that cabinet, then the person cannot be compelled to give any evidence or produce any document. The state government after consultation with the lokayukta, in view of public interest, may exempt a public servant from investigation via notification in the state gazette .

The following matters cannot be covered in the investigation conducted by the lokayukta.
 Investigations related to crime. 
 Proceedings relating to the internal security of the state.
 Actions in relation to determining whether a matter will go or will continue to be prosecuted in a court.
 Action concerning commercial relations of the administration of the government or of the local authority or other corporations, except where the complainant alleged harassment in meeting contractual obligations. 
 Appointments related to removal, pay, disciplinary action, superannuation or other matters relating to conditions of services of public servants but not including actions relating to claims for pension, gratuity, provident fund or to any claims which arises on retirement, removal or termination of service. 
 Grant of honors and awards. If this is done in a confidential manner,an investigation cell may be established under the Lokayukta.

Removal
According to the Article 311 of the constitution, the lokayukta or an up-lokayukta can be removed only if found guilty in the report of committee headed by the judge of either Supreme court or Chief justice of the High court. The report is then forwarded to the Governor and then presented before the state legislature with each house of the legislature votes for the removal by 2/3 majority.

See also
 Lokayukta
 Lokpal
 The Lokpal and Lokayuktas Act, 2013
 Maharashtra Lokayukta
 Karnataka Lokayukta
 Goa Lokayukta
 Andhra Pradesh Lokayukta
 Assam Lokayukta
 Telangana Lokayukta
 Delhi Lokayukta
 Himachal Pradesh Lokayukta
 Bihar Lokayukta
 West Bengal Lokayukta
 Haryana Lokayukta
 Chhattisgarh Lokayog

Notes

References

External links 
 Details of the case filed by Mohd.Saeed Siddiqui on new Lokayukta appointment
 Karnataka Lokayukta
 Kerala Lok Ayukta

Lokayuktas
Government of Uttar Pradesh
1977 establishments in Uttar Pradesh
Government agencies established in 1977